Clarence Leonard "Sal" Walker (13 December 1898 – 30 April 1957) was a South African bantamweight professional boxer who competed in the early 1920s. He won the gold medal at the 1920 Summer Olympics, defeating Chris Graham in the final. He was born in Port Elizabeth, and died in Roodepoort, Gauteng. His paternal grandfather was from Scotland.

Olympic results 
 Defeated Alfons Bouwens (Belgium)
 Defeated Edwart Hartman (United States)
 Defeated George McKenzie (Great Britain)
 Defeated Chris Graham (Canada)

References

External links
 
 

1898 births
1957 deaths
Sportspeople from Port Elizabeth
Cape Colony people
Bantamweight boxers
Olympic boxers of South Africa
Olympic gold medalists for South Africa
Boxers at the 1920 Summer Olympics
Olympic medalists in boxing
Medalists at the 1920 Summer Olympics
South African male boxers
South African people of Scottish descent
White South African people
Male boxers from Cape Colony